David Goddard, Baron Goddard of Stockport (born 2 October 1952) is a British Liberal Democrat politician. He was made a life peer, as Baron Goddard of Stockport, of Stockport in the County of Greater Manchester, on 15 September 2014. A gas engineer by trade, he was an elected member of Stockport Metropolitan Borough Council from 1990 until 2012, and was elected again in 2014 before standing down in 2018. He was leader of the council between 2007 and 2012.

References

External links 
 Lord Goddard of Stockport – UK Parliament

Liberal Democrats (UK) life peers
Living people
Place of birth missing (living people)
1952 births
Councillors in Stockport
Leaders of local authorities of England
Liberal Democrats (UK) councillors
Life peers created by Elizabeth II
Members of the Greater Manchester Combined Authority